Ruairí Lynch (born 5 October 1983), known by the stage name Bantum, is an Irish multi-instrumentalist, musician, DJ, producer and composer.

Early life
Lynch grew up in Cork. He has no formal music training, having studied Business Information Systems in University College Cork. The Chemical Brothers were an early inspiration.

Career
Lynch began making music in Dublin in 2010. The name "Bantum" originated as a mishearing of the wrestling term "bantamweight." He composed music for the short Little Bear (2015). Bantum released the album Move in 2016, which was nominated for the prestigious Choice Music Prize. He was also nominated by The Irish Times for Irish Artist Of The Year in that year.

Discography
Studio albums
Legion (2012)
Move (2016)

References

External links
Official site

Bantum on Bandcamp

1982 births
20th-century Irish people
21st-century Irish people
Living people
Musicians from County Cork
Irish DJs
Alumni of University College Cork